Gävle Municipality (Gävle kommun) is a municipality in east central Sweden. The municipal seat is located in the Stad (city) of  Gävle.

Geographically the municipality is situated north of the mouth of the river Dalälven and is the southernmost municipality of the historical land of Norrland.

The present municipality was created in 1971, when the City of Gävle was amalgamated with four surrounding rural municipalities. All of them were original entities, instituted as municipalities by the local government acts of 1862. The area had not been affected by the national subdivision reform in 1952.

Geography
Gävle is situated by the Baltic Sea near the mouth of the river Dalälven. At 60 degrees north and 17 degrees east, Gävle has the same latitude as Helsinki and the same longitude as Vienna and Cape Town.

Localities

Data from 2000.

Economy
Major employers in Gävle:
 Gävle Municipality 8,000
 County Council 8,000
 Stora Enso 1,200
 Ericsson   1,100
 BillerudKorsnäs  1,100
 Lantmäteriet  900

Whisky
Mackmyra Whisky in Valbo, a suburb of Gävle, is the only whisky distillery in Sweden. Malt whisky is produced since 1999.

Politics
The municipal assembly (kommunfullmäktige) has 65 members, elected for a four-year period. The last election was held in September 2018. Eight parties are represented in the assembly. The largest party is the Swedish Social Democratic Party which has 21 seats. The current chairman of the municipal assembly is the social democrat Eva Aländer, with the current chairman of the municipal executive committee (kommunstyrelsen) is Åsa Wiklund Lång.

Education
The University College of Gävle currently enrolls 12,500 students.

It offers courses of study at six departments: Business Administration, Education and Psychology, Caring Sciences and Sociology, Humanities and Social Sciences, Mathematics, Natural and Computer Sciences and Technology, and Built Environment.

Some courses are given in English taught both to visiting students from foreign partner institutions and to Swedish students.

International relations

Town twinning
The municipality's  is twinned with:
 Buffalo City, South Africa
 Álftanes, Iceland
 Gjøvik, Norway
 Næstved Municipality, Denmark
 Rauma, Finland
 Jūrmala, Latvia
 Galva, Illinois, United States

See also
Municipalities of Sweden
List of Swedish municipalities
International Ice Hockey Federation World Championships (1995)
Gävleborg County Administrative Board
List of Gävleborg Governors

References
Notes

External links 

Gävle - Official site
National Atlas of Sweden - Statistics

 
Gävle
Municipalities of Gävleborg County
1971 establishments in Sweden